Valvrave the Liberator is a 2013 Japanese mecha anime series.
The Third Galactic Reich began on the 71st Year of the True Calendar. By this time, almost 70% of the human population, having divided itself into three factions: ARUS, JIOR and Dorssia, had migrated into space following the creation of Dyson Spheres—massive space habitats capable of sustaining human life. This segregation created an ongoing conflict between the hostile Dorssian forces which seek to expand their territory and the allied ARUS and neutral JIOR factions. Subsequently, the JIOR scientists developed a highly advanced weaponized mecha technology called Valvrave which possess enough power to turn the tide of the war. With each of the hostile factions now desiring this weapon, high schoolers, Haruto Tokishima and his friends pilot the Valvrave mechs and use them to protect their Module 77 home from the Dorssian forces.

The anime is produced by Sunrise and chiefly directed by Kō Matsuo with series composition and script supervision by Ichirō Ōkouchi, original character designs by Katsura Hoshino, art direction by Masatoshi Kai, sound direction by Masafumi Mima and soundtrack music by Akira Senju. The series' first and second seasons premiered on MBS on April 12, 2013 and October 10, 2013 respectively. The series received later airings on TBS, CBC, RKB, HBC, BS-TBS and Animax. The series was licensed by Aniplex of America for streaming on Aniplex Channel. Crunchyroll also obtained the series for streaming with English subtitles in North America, United Kingdom, and Ireland. The series was released on home media disc format by Aniplex in Japan, Aniplex of America in North America and by Hanabee Entertainment in Australia and New Zealand.

The anime uses ten pieces of theme music: two opening themes, four ending themes and four insert songs.



Episode list

Theme music
The anime uses ten pieces of theme music: two opening themes, four ending themes and four insert songs.

Opening themes
"Preserved Roses" by T.M.Revolution and Nana Mizuki — Episodes 2 - 12 (Ending theme of Episode 1 / Insert song of Episode 7)
 by Nana Mizuki and T.M.Revolution — Episodes 14 - 24 (Ending theme of Episode 13 / Insert song of Episode 22)

Ending themes
 by Angela — Episodes 2 - 6 (Insert song of Episodes 12 and 19)
 by Elisa — Episodes 7 - 12 (Insert song of Episodes 16 and 24)
"Realism" by Elisa — Episodes 14 - 18
 by Momoko Kanade — Episodes 19 - 23

Insert songs
 by the students of Sakimori Academy — Episode 4
"Good luck for you" by Haruka Tomatsu — Episode 5
"Can you save my heart?" by Momoko Kanade — Episode 6
"Mother land" by Yuuka Nanri — Episodes 8 and 21

Home media
Aniplex released the full first season on six Blu-ray and DVD volumes in Japan between June 26, 2013 and November 27, 2013. The second season was also released in a similar manner in Japan between December 25, 2013 and May 28, 2014. Season 1 was released in its entirety by Aniplex of America on September 18, 2014. Hanabee Entertainment also released the series on disc format beginning on October 1, 2014.

Notes

References

External links
 Valvrave the Liberator Official Japanese website 
 Valvrave the Liberator Official English website

Valvrave the Liberator